Lasionycta uniformis is a moth of the family Noctuidae. It is widely distributed in the mountains of western North America. It occurs from southern Yukon to northern California and Colorado, with an isolated population in eastern Quebec.

It flies over alpine tundra and is most common on rocky slopes near treeline. It is predominantly nocturnal, is attracted to light and can be found feeding at Silene acaulis. Adults have been collected from.

Adults are on wing from early July to late August.

Subspecies
Lasionycta uniformis uniformis (Rocky Mountains and Purcell Mountains of southwestern British Columbia north to northeastern British Columbia)
Lasionycta uniformis multicolor (from Montana Mountain in southwestern Yukon, south in the British Columbia Coast Range to the Cascades in southern Washington)
Lasionycta uniformis fusca (from central Colorado and northern Utah to the Beartooth Plateau on the Wyoming-Montana border)
Lasionycta uniformis shasta (on Mount Shasta in the Cascade Range of northern California. It might be more widely distributed in northern California and Oregon in the southern Cascades or Klamath Mountains)
Lasionycta uniformis handfieldi (on Mount Albert in the Gaspé Peninsula of Quebec)

External links
A Revision of Lasionycta Aurivillius (Lepidoptera, Noctuidae) for North America and notes on Eurasian species, with descriptions of 17 new species, 6 new subspecies, a new genus, and two new species of Tricholita Grote

Lasionycta
Moths of North America
Moths described in 1893